Hemisphaerotini is a Neotropical tribe of tortoise beetles and hispines in the family Chrysomelidae. There are at least 2 genera and more than 40 described species in Hemisphaerotini.
 The eggs, larvae and pupae have been described.

Genera
These two genera belong to the tribe Hemisphaerotini:
 Hemisphaerota Chevrolat in Dejean, 1836
 Spaethiella Barber & Bridwell, 1940

References

Further reading

External links

Cassidinae
Articles created by Qbugbot